The UNESCO Atlas of the World's Languages in Danger was an online publication containing a comprehensive list of the world's endangered languages. It originally replaced the Red Book of Endangered Languages as a title in print after a brief period of overlap before being transferred to an online only publication.

History

In 1992 the International Congress of Linguists (CIPL) meeting in Canada discussed the topic of endangered languages, as a result of which it formed the Endangered Languages Committee. It held an international meeting also in 1992 in Paris to place the topic before the world and initiate action. The meeting was considered important enough to come under the authority of UNESCO.

At the instigation of Stephen Wurm the committee resolved to create a research center, the International Clearing House for Endangered Languages (ICHEL) and to publish the UNESCO Red Book of Endangered Languages based on the data it collected, the title being derived from that of the Red Book of Endangered Species. Shigeru Tsuchida was to start the research center. It began in 1994 at the University of Tokyo with Tasaka Tsunoda as its director.

Meanwhile, the initial reports on endangered languages had already been collected and submitted to UNESCO by regional experts in 1993. These have since been turned over to ICHEL, which created a website to enable regularly updates to be made available promptly.

In February 2009, UNESCO launched an online edition of the Atlas of Endangered Languages which covers the whole world, contains much more information than previous printed editions and offers the possibility to users to provide online feedback, in view of its constant updating. In May 2022, that website began experiencing a security and redirection problem that has not been fixed.

Classification 

The UNESCO list has 6 categories of endangerment:

 Extinct: There are no speakers left. The Atlas presumes extinction if there have been no known speakers since the 1950s.

 Critically endangered: The youngest speakers are grandparents and older, and they speak the language partially and infrequently

 Severely endangered: The language is spoken by grandparents and older generations. While the parent generation may understand it, they do not speak it to children or among themselves

 Definitely endangered: Children no longer learn the language as a mother tongue in the home.

 Vulnerable: Most children speak the language, but it may be restricted to certain domains (e.g. home)

 Safe / Not Endangered: Is spoken by all generations and intergenerational transmission is uninterrupted. These languages are not included in the Atlas as they are not endangered.

References

External links
 
 

Endangered languages projects
UNESCO
1994 works
2010 works